Ivar Frithiof Andresen (27 July 1896 – 6 November 1940) was a Norwegian opera singer who pursued a successful international career in Europe and the United States.

Andresen was the first Norwegian to perform at the Metropolitan Opera in New York City (preceding his famous compatriot, the great Wagnerian soprano Kirsten Flagstad, by five years). A bass, he appeared in operas composed by Wagner, Mozart and Verdi.

Biography
Andresen was born in Kristiania. He then performed at the Dresden Semperoper  (in 1926–1931)  and the Städtische Oper Berlin (1931–1935), and also appeared as a guest artist at the New York Met (1930–1932) and the Bayreuth Festival (1927–1936).

In England, he sang at the Royal Opera House, Covent Garden, in 1928–1931 and at the Glyndebourne Festival in 1935.

Andresen's singing earned considerable critical acclaim during his appearances in England, America and Germany, but developing health problems would curtail his career, and he died at the age of 44, in Stockholm, during the early stages of World War II.

He left, however, a sizeable legacy of 78-rpm gramophone recordings made in the 1920s and 1930s, which have been re-issued on compact disc.

Today, in Norway, Andresen is probably best known not for being an opera star, but for adorning the box of the cough-drop brand "IFA", produced by the Nidar company. Since the 1930s, his face has been seen on the package, along with a quote recommending the product to "singers, public speakers, smokers and athletes".  Ivar F. Andresen was also the great uncle to Secretary General of the North Atlantic Treaty Organization  and former Norwegian prime minister Jens Stoltenberg.

Recordings on CD
Lebendige Vergangenheit – Ivar Andrésen
Arias by Jacques Halévy, Giacomo Meyerbeer, Mozart, Giuseppe Verdi, and Richard Wagner
Preiser Records CD PSR 89028

Lebendige Vergangenheit – Ivar Andrésen Vol 2
Arias and Lieder by Meyerbeer, Richard Wagner, Carl Loewe, Richard Strauss, and Ludwig Fischer
Preiser Records CD PSR 89125

References

Sources
 Rosenthal, Harold and John Warrack. (1979, 2nd ed.). The Concise Oxford Dictionary of Opera. London, New York and Melbourne: Oxford University Press. p. 12. .
 Sadie, Stanley and Christina Bashford. (1992). The New Grove Dictionary of Opera. London: Macmillan Publishers Ltd. Vol. 1, p. 129. .
 Sadie, Stanley and John Tyrrell. (2001).The New Grove Dictionary of Music and Musicians. London: Macmillan Publishers Ltd. Vol. 1, p. 630. .

External links

1896 births
1940 deaths
20th-century Norwegian male opera singers
Operatic basses